Donald M. Russell is a former American football coach.  He was the head football coach at Wesleyan University from 1964 to 1970 and has the highest winning percentage (.661) of any Wesleyan football coach with more than two years as head coach.

Early years
A native of Quincy, Massachusetts, Russell graduated from Bates College in Lewiston, Maine in 1951.  He played offensive and defensive tackle for the Bates College football team.  After graduating from Bates, Russell spent nine years as a high school teacher and football coach at Hollis High School in Hollis, Maine, Thornton Academy in Saco, Maine, and Turner Falls High School in Turners Falls, Massachusetts.

Wesleyan football coach
In 1960, Russell joined the coaching staff at Wesleyan University as an assistant football coach under Norm Daniels.  After Daniels took a sabbatical, Russell took over as the head football coach in June 1964.  He also became Wesleyan's athletic director and chairman of the physical education department in 1968.  His best season at Wesleyan was in 1969 when he led the Wesleyan Cardinals football team to an undefeated, untied 8–0 record and a Little Three championship.  The 1969 Cardinals also shared the Lambert Cup with Delaware as the best small college team in the East, and Russell was selected as the 1969 New England small college coach of the year.  He also led Wesleyan to Little Three football championships in 1966 and 1970.  In seven years as the head football coach at Wesleyan, Russell compiled a record of 37–19.  His winning percentage of .661 is the highest among all Wesleyan football coaches with more than two years on the job and is the highest among all football coaches since 1920.  In November 1970, Russell announced his intention to retire from active coaching at the end of the year in order to allow him to devote full time to his job as chairman of the university's physical education department.

References

Year of birth missing (living people)
Living people
American football tackles
Bates Bobcats football players
Wesleyan Cardinals football coaches
Wesleyan University faculty
High school football coaches in Maine
High school football coaches in Massachusetts
Sportspeople from Quincy, Massachusetts
Players of American football from  Massachusetts